The Healthy Homes Guarantee Act is an Act of Parliament in New Zealand which sets minimum standards for rental housing including heating and insulation. It passed its third reading on 30 November 2017 and received royal assent on 4 December 2017.

Legislative history
This law will require landlords to guarantee that any new tenancy from 1 July 2019 must be either properly insulated or contain a heating source able to make the home warm and dry.  All tenancies must meet the new standards by 1 July 2024. The exact requirements are not in the bill, but will be set by the Government before 2019. Grants of up to $2000 will be available for eligible landlords to upgrade their stock. Under the previous law rentals were only required to be insulated – by the same date in 2019 – if it was practicable, with 100,000 homes excluded from the requirement. This law enables the Government to set standards for rental housing quality. The Healthy Homes standards will cover heating, insulation, ventilation, draught stopping, drainage and moisture. Many landlords will already meet these standards and will not have to change anything. For those that need to upgrade their properties, government grants for installing heating and insulation will be available.

History
Twyford's Healthy Homes Guarantee Bill was first drawn from the Parliamentary ballot in 2013, but was struck down at its first reading. Then-Labour leader Andrew Little introduced a second version, which made it through its second reading with the votes of every party except ACT and National. This allowed Labour to pick up the bill, modify it, and pass it relatively quickly.

On 29 November 2017 the bill passed its third reading by 63 votes to 57, where the Labour-led Coalition Government had supported the bill to become law. The opposition parties National and ACT opposed the bill. The Healthy Homes Guarantee Bill became law after receiving royal assent on 4 December 2017.

References

Further reading

2017 in New Zealand law
Statutes of New Zealand
Housing in New Zealand